OsWALD, also known as OsWALD Of The Ice Floes, is a 1988 Danish computer game for Amiga and Commodore 64. The game was designed by Ivan Sølvason for use as a game controlled over a push-button telephone, for Danish TV2's Friday night prime time program Eleva2ren. The game sold well in Denmark due to the exposure in Eleva2ren.

Sølvason later designed Hugo the TV Troll, also for Eleva2ren and using the same push-button telephone concept.

Legacy
A new version of the game named Super OsWALD, with a two-player mode, was created for Eleva2ren in 1989.

References

External links
 Amiga Longplay OsWALD - World of Longplays, YouTube
 Amiga Longplay Super OsWALD - World of Longplays, YouTube
 OsWald og Hugo (1988 og 1990) - Dansk Datahistorisk Forening

1988 video games
Amiga games
Commodore 64 games
Video games developed in Denmark